Ivanpah Lake is a dry lake bed in the Mojave Desert of San Bernardino County, California on the border of California and Nevada. Nestled in the Ivanpah Valley near Primm on Interstate 15, the  lake is almost entirely within California. At the north edge of the lake lie the Nevada Welcome Center (closed) and a California Lottery retailer. It is a popular place for land sailing and kite buggying.

Environmental contamination
Hundreds of thousands of gallons of water carrying radioactive waste from rare earth element mining spilled into and around Ivanpah Dry Lake.

In the 1980s, the Mountain Pass rare earth mine began piping wastewater as far as 14 miles to evaporation ponds on or near Ivanpah Dry Lake, east of Interstate 15 near Nevada. This pipeline repeatedly ruptured during cleaning operations to remove mineral deposits called scale. The scale is radioactive because of the presence of thorium and radium, which occur naturally in the rare earth ore. A federal investigation later found that some 60 spills—some unreported—occurred between 1984 and 1998, when the pipeline was shut down. By the end of the 1990s, Unocal had been hit with a cleanup order and a San Bernardino County district attorney's lawsuit. The company paid more than $1.4 million in fines and settlements. After preparing a cleanup plan and completing an extensive environmental study, Unocal in 2004 won approval of a county permit that allowed the mine to operate for another 30 years. In 2008, Unocal/Chevron sold the mine to privately held Molycorp Minerals LLC, a company formed to revive the Mountain Pass Mine.

See also
 List of lakes in California

References

External links

 
 Satellite Photo (Google Maps)
 Bureau of Land Management - Needles CA district including access information

Ivanpah Valley
Endorheic lakes of California
Lakes of the Mojave Desert
Lakes of San Bernardino County, California
Lakes of California
Lakes of Southern California